Abū 'l-Ḥasan al-Muḫtār Yuwānnīs ibn al-Ḥasan ibn ʿAbdūn ibn Saʿdūn ibn Buṭlān (ca. first quarter of the 11th century AD – 8 Šauwāl 458 AH/2 September 1066 AD) known as Ibn Buṭlān was a physician and Arab Christian theologian from Baghdad during the Abbasid era. He left his hometown for travels throughout the Iraq, Syria, Egypt, and Asia Minor during which he practiced medicine, studied, wrote, and engaged in intellectual debates most famously the Battle of the Physicians with Ibn Riḍwān. He was a first-hand witness of the Schism of 1054 in Constantinople, contributing a work to the discussions surrounding it for Patriarch Michael I Cerularius. After his time in Constantinople he remained in the Byzantine Empire, becoming a monk in Antioch during the end of the Macedonian Renaissance.

He is most renowned for his work Taqwīm aṣ-Ṣiḥḥa a handbook on dietetics and hygiene. He was the first person to use these tables in a non-astrological work, creating a new scientific writing format and should therefore be seen as the main influence on all subsequent uses of this format, like Ibn Ǧazla's  and Abū 'l-Fidāʾ's . The many preserved manuscripts of Latin translations of the Taqwīm aṣ-Ṣiḥḥa in Europe are thought to illustrate the relationship between early modern Europe and the Arab World in the field of medical science. Despite increased European contact with Egypt and Syria because of the Crusades and trade into the sixteenth century there are no Latin translations of medical texts from Arab writers after Ibn Buṭlān.

Ibn Buṭlān is additionally noteworthy for being one of a few non-Muslim physicians about whom enough is known to paint a detailed biography, during a period when the People of the Pact, that is Christians, Jews, and Sabians, dominated the medical profession. Documents like the Cairo Geniza provide scientific records about the medical practices of such physicians but lack reliable information outside of that to create detailed biographies about them and to describe their perception and role within society. Ibn Buṭlān therefore presents an important exception to this general lack of sources.

Education

Ibn Buṭlān was the favourite student of Ibn aṭ-Ṭaiyib, a Nestorian leader, priest, and polymath, at al-ʿAḍudī Hospital. He taught him about philosophy and medicine. He instructed him in the works of Galen, Aristotle, and Hippocrates – additionally in those of Porphyry, Themistius, Dioscorides, and more contemporary Arab physicians like Ibn al-Ḫammār, Ibn Zurʿa, and Ḥunain ibn Isḥāq. He also was educated about practical medical procedures in line with a new experimentation-based medical learning approach proposed by Persian physician ar-Razī. Ibn Buṭlān studied in the al-Karḫ district of Baghdad, in which many Christians lived and also received an ecclesial education from his teacher, who is considered the most important exegete of Christian Arabic literature. He became a priest, taking up the name  upon his ordination. It is claimed by al-Qifṭī and by Ibn Abī Uṣaibiʿa that he also was a student of Abū 'l-Ḥasan al-Ḥarrānī, a Sabian physician and translator. Schacht and Meyerhof however find this claim doubtful as they argue he had been deceased prior to Ibn Buṭlān's birth, though in his own Essay on Hot and Cold Remedies Ibn Buṭlān states to have been in the presence of al-Ḥarrānī in Baghdad.

Schacht and Meyerhof, as well as Conrad, claim he knew Greek based on his Christian upbringing. However Graf proves in his translation of the Essay on the Holy Eucharist that he did not know Greek, as Ibn Buṭlān states so himself. However Ibn aṭ-Ṭaiyib taught him about the writers of Greek literary classics, such as Homer. Schacht and Meyerhof, as well as Conrad, also claim that he knew Syriac based on his upbringing, while the only surviving texts of his are written in Arabic, he did address Syriac medical learning and Syriac places of learning in the Compendium for the Monasteries and the Monks. It should also be noted that a major difference between him and his teacher's generation of Christian physicians in Baghdad – in many ways even between him and his own generation – is his turn away from Syriac literature to embracing Arabic literature. He showed great interest in Arabic poetry and pursued an education therein. He himself became a teacher of medicine and philosophy before leaving Baghdad in the beginning of Ramaḍān 440 AH/January 1049 AD.

Travels 
His travels began with a 10-month-long journey to al-Fusṭāṭ, an hour's walk south from the newly established Fatimid capital of Cairo. According to Ibn Abī Uṣaibiʿa he travelled to meet Ibn Riḍwān, a prominent medical writer and chief physician of the Fatimid caliph al-Mustanṣir bi-'llāh. Schacht and Meyerhof suggest that instead he sought employment at the court of said caliph, who held high opinions of non-Muslim physicians. According to Conrad Ibn Buṭlān's comment,s about the young physician's motivations to move away from Baghdad in The Physicians' Banquet, are to be understood quasi-autobiographically. Meaning that high costs of living in his hometown caused him to want to live in a more affordable city. In addition to this, there appears to have been a lack of professional opportunities in Baghdad for him.

He travelled via the Nahr ʿĪsā Canal to al-Anbar and from there to ar-Raḥba during the first 19 days of his travels. He describes ar-Raḥba as a quaint town offering a grand variety of fruits, for example 19 different kinds of grapes alone. From there it took him four days to travel to ar-Reṣafa. There he visited its castle, which was used as a caravanserai. He describes it as being very large in size, yet smaller than the Caliph's palace in Baghdad. He described the outsides of the basilica located within the castle as being covered in golden mosaics, the basilica as having been built on a cistern in the ground as large as the above ground building itself. He writes about the inhabitants of the castle, who were Christian bedouins earning their keep by guarding caravans and trading goods. Ibn Buṭlān comments about this arrangement that these beduins are "both beggars and robbers at once". He claims the basilica to have been founded by Constantine I and once restored and inhabited by Hišām ibn ʿAbd al-Malik. 

Ibn Buṭlān's journey from ar-Reṣafa to Aleppo took four days. He he remained in Aleppo for a longer period of time. His departure from Aleppo to travel to Antioch had him visit the Byzantine village of ʿImm. After visiting Antioch he travelled to Laodicea from there he proceeded to Damascus, then Jaffa, and finally arrived in al-Fusṭāṭ in Ǧumādā II 441 AH/November 1049 AD.

Aleppo 

While in Aleppo, which he reached after 27 days, he gained the graces of Muʿizz ad-Daula Ṯimāl ibn Ṣāliḥ, the Emir of the city, and set up a medical practice there. The impression he left in North Syria was so great that he became a notable figure in the local oral canon, three of these stories were recorded by Usāma ibn Munqiḏ in his Kitab al-Iʿtibār; in these stories Ibn Buṭlān is a medical sage operating out of a shop and has a son and students; he cures a man who had lost the ability to speak with a raṭl (in Aleppo during this time a 3/4th litre) of vinegar, which is claimed to kill a man under normal circumstances by the Ibn Buṭlān of the narrative; in the second story he explains that Usāma's grandfather who is presumed to suffer from leprosy is not ill but simply suffers from skin irritations caused by adolescence which will disappear upon him reaching adulthood and warns of greedy medical quacks offering to cure him; in the third story a woman who wears many veils because she persistently feels too hot is cured using camphor. What is remarkable about these stories is that they –with the exception of the personal anecdote from Usāma's own family– appear to be fictional, Ibn Buṭlān left Baghdad destitute and most certainly would not have travelled with dependants and he was not long enough in Aleppo to be born a son there, medicine at that time would not have been practiced out of a shop but the physician's home, a raṭl of vinegar is not deadly, and the anatomy in the stories is based on medical misconceptions which Ibn Buṭlān did not hold. Hence his son and students are inventions to fit the motif of the medical sage curing difficult cases with superior medical knowledge, which in all likelihood means that his kunya  (lit. "father of al-Ḥasan) does not refer to a real son of his. This is also backed up by Ibn Abī Uṣaibiʿa who quotes him lamenting having to die without any offspring or ever having taken a wife with a line from one of Ibn Buṭlān's poems:

In his account he relays that Ibn Buṭlān is said to have founded the hospital in Aleppo to determine the best location he is meant to have hung up meat to check for air quality, that is to see where meat decayed the slowest and was the least discoloured. He begins his account with the cautionary phrase "qīla". This speaks to his skills in verifying oral tradition, as he does not use this phrase in the previous account in which he tells of Ibn Buṭlān founding the hospital in Antioch. This legend is relevant in so far as it is a variation of another medical sage-type legend told about ar-Razī and al-ʿAḍudī Hospital, describing the exact same method, further associating Ibn Buṭlān with the motif.

Ibn Buṭlān approached the Emir  to be entrusted with the regulation of Christian worship in Aleppo. This request was granted. Klein-Franke elucidates that Ibn Buṭlān as a student of Ibn aṭ-Ṭaiyib was likely influenced by his work Law of Christianity a Nestorian treatise on jurisprudential and administrative matters, containing an extensive collection of canon law, to try and apply the laws and principles identified by his teacher in this community, which included extensive deliberations over marital and inheritance law. While Ibn Buṭlān himself was, at that time, a Nestorian, the Christian community in Aleppo consisted largely of Monophysite Jacobite Armenian Christians. In his narration al-Qifṭī simply states "and he began to enforce religious regulations according to their principles and provisions" this both implies that he began to change things and that Ibn Buṭlān's then Nestorian faith and that of a Monophysite community adhere to the same beliefs, which is not the case as the conflict between Nestorius' and Cyril of Alexandria's is what led to the formation of Nestorianism and Monophysitism in the first place, the largest conflict within the Oriental Orthodox Church, which consequently led to the Council of Chalcedon. In fact Ibn Buṭlān would go on to condemn Monophysite beliefs in his work The Physicians' Banquet, though likely after no longer being a Nestorian. A possible reason for the Aleppine Armenian community's staunch dislike for him long after his stay. The two met each other and struck a conversation which turned onto the subject of dialectics. Ibn Šarāra possessed no knowledge of this subject, while Ibn Buṭlān was very well educated therein. This led to Ibn Šarāra being publicly humiliated. He consequently began to vilify Ibn Buṭlān after this humiliation and instigated further agitation against him in the already oppositional Aleppine Christian community. This caused Ibn Buṭlān to leave Aleppo early. It is likely for this reason that al-Qifṭī reports "and he did not find anything pleasant to say about [Aleppo] and left". Unlike in the rest of North Syria his legacy in the Christian community of Aleppo was not a positive one of a legendary medical-sage, instead its members recited offensive poems about him and after his death began telling a tale that each time the lamp above his tomb in Antioch was lit, it went out instantly; implying Ibn Buṭlān's grave itself to be cursed.

Antioch, Laodicea, and Damascus 

After leaving Aleppo he arrived in Antioch within two days. He does not acknowledge it being under Byzantine rule at that time in any way. The ongoing geopolitical and religious conflicts and wars between Byzantines, Fāṭimids, Mirdāsids and Marwānids encountered during his travels generally remain unmentioned in his writings – attesting as Klein-Franke remarks a notable freedom of movement, despite ongoing conflicts. Ibn Buṭlān gained favour with rulers of many backgrounds and travelled across borders with no recorded difficulties doing so. He described Antioch in great detail and spoke favourably of the city. He may have had a personal relationship to Antioch and might have received a warm initial welcoming due to his teacher Ibn aṭ-Ṭaiyib being born there according to Ibn al-ʿAdīm; however Ibn al-ʿAdīm is the only source for this claim, with most other sources assuming he was born in the land of the Iraq.

Near Antioch Ibn Buṭlān visited the Monastery of Symeon the Younger, the size and fortune of which impressed him greatly. From there he travelled to al-Lāḏiqīa (Laodicea), where he conversed with Christian monks and hermits, the wisdom and insight of whom he lauded. In his descriptions he implies that the hippodrome and amphitheater were still used and that the former pagan temple of the city, which had once been converted into a mosque was now a church. He also commented on the ringing of the bells by Christians to interrupt the city's muezzin's aḏān, Conrad interprets his description to be disapproving of this behaviour by the Christian community. He also took keen interest in the agoranomos (he calls him ) whose duties included inspecting the prostitutes of the city and facilitating their transactions. This process consisted of gathering of all the women and the foreigners, likely meaning their procurers not their clients, and inspecting the women. Following this occurred the auction, a means of taxation, during which procurers bid against each other in dirham. Bidding more based on the women's  expected profitability for the night. The winner was given the stamp of the metropolitan and would take the woman to his brothel where she would receive clients. The wālī likely being something akin to a police officer would go around at night inspecting the brothels and criminally charge, possibly with fraud, the procurers who operated without a stamp. Ibn Buṭlān uses morally condemning and highly disapproving language when describing this process.

He After al-Lāḏiqīya he visited Damascus, where a large debate had been taking place. Subject of this debate was an old conundrum of Greek natural science, disscussed in the problemata literature inherited by the Arab world: Which is warmer the young of the bird or the young chick? At the core of the question lies Aristotle's teaching about the relation of warmth and movement, that is the quicker something moves the warmer it is; the young chicken can peck on its own, the young bird must remain in its nest, but chickens as a whole move less quickly than birds who can fly. An otherwise unknown author by the name of  had started this debate by arguing in favour of the young chicken. A Jacobite Christian physician called  had responded to al-Muwaffaqī arguing that the young of the bird was warmer than the chick. Though al-Yabrūdī had passed very shortly before Ibn Buṭlān entered Damascus, the debate was still ongoing and Ibn Buṭlān was convinced of al-Yabrūdī's position though entirely unconvinced by his reasoning. This seemingly innocuous debate would be of great consequence to Ibn Buṭlān's life.

Battle of the Physicians 

Upon his arrival in al-Fusṭāṭ Ibn Buṭlān came to visit the palace of Ǧauahr ibn Māḍī. Conrad (understanding the Physicians' Banquet's comments about the arrival of the young physician in Māiyafāriqīn to be allegorical for Ibn Buṭlān's experiences in Egypt) and Kennedy (reading the work only as partly allegorical) both claim Ibn Buṭlān was warmly received at the court and praised by its chief physician, Ibn Riḍwān. Ibn Buṭlān had been writing missives to Hilāl aṣ-Ṣabi of Baghdad throughout his travels, these spanned a wide range of topics such as medicine and geography. Once in Egypt he began working on his notes and writings compiled during his trip in this process of writing missives, which caused him to have an excellent reputation and left Egyptian intellectuals excitedly awaiting the publishing of his finished work. Though he never finished this work, a book extensively compiled from his missives after his death called Kitāb ar-Rabīʿ proved useful to other scholars. Conrad suggests, based on his allegorical reading of the Physicians' Banquet that Ibn Riḍwān continued being of some help to Ibn Buṭlān, introducing him to prominent medical practitioners of the city. And yet this satirical text also makes the defamatory suggestion all decent and educated persons of the city despised, the old physician, whom Conrad understands to be Ibn Riḍwān. That these persons saw him as a self-important fraud with no interest in the serious questions of medical profession, though this passage was written long after their dispute had occurred.

Ibn Riḍwān was the son of poor baker from Giza, his parents died young he therefore had no inheritance to fund his studies with, thus he became a roadside fortuneteller to fund his education. He therefore guarded his position in manner which was perceived as aggressive and polemicising. He also worked against the perception of having been, what the medical community of that time considered, a charlatan prior to a physician. This attitude might not solely have been the result of an irritable temperament; the nature of professional medicine in the Arab world at the time was entirely dependent on one's patrons and social standing in a city, in the absence of medical boards and standardised systems to ensure medical knowledge of practitioners. Self-learning was equally regarded as a source of education compared to learning from a teacher at an institution, therefore social standing and one's reputation were the primary basis of a successful career in medicine. Ibn Riḍwān was described by Ibn Buṭlān as a man with a fondness for "futile uproar". He attacked many of his colleagues with barrages of personal insults without having interacted much with them prior. One such public outburst had been targeted at Ibn aṭ-Ṭaiyib, a later one at Ibn Buṭlān. It occurred in response to Ibn Buṭlān's attempt to improve his reputation among the educated upper class of Cairo with the assumed intention of gaining a maecenas. Encouraged by an unnamed wazir of the court Ibn Buṭlān's sent the open essay On Objections, against those who said that the Chick is Warmer than the Young of the [Flying] Bird, using the Manner of Rationality to Ibn Riḍwān expecting his endorsement. This subject would have been of much interest in Cairo at the time as the city had a large poultry industry, known for its well documented widespread use of artificial egg incubation in so called "laying-hen factories". Ibn Buṭlān did not know that al-Yabrūdī, the man whose reasoning and knowledge of the ancients was described as insufficient and unconvincing by the essay, had been a personal friend of Ibn Riḍwān. Additionally Ibn Riḍwān once wanted to become a student of Ibn aṭ-Ṭaiyib himself, but could not afford the travel to Baghdad. Ibn Buṭlān also wrote in this first essay that al-Yabrūdī had been in communication with other Egyptian physicians — something which Ibn Abī Uṣaibiʿa also records — and he mentions that in the introduction to his work that education is "almost a burden in Egypt, a country in which it is hard to gain equal footing with the ignorant/foolish".

According to Conrad this led combination of factors:

 Ibn Riḍwān feeling he had been slighted in his honour by having been called ignorant
 The suggestion his friend would have contacted another man about such an important question
 That friend's honour being slighted by a man whose education he was personally jealous of
 Ibn Riḍwān sensing a threat to his position in Cairo's social order because it was motivated by a wazir

Which in their totality led Ibn Riḍwān's response Discourse of the Sheikh Abū 'l-Ḥasan ʿAlī Ibn Riḍwān Explaining the Mistakes in the Sayings of al-Muḫtār Ibn al-Ḥasan Ibn ʿAbdūn of Baghdad to be scathing. The tone of this work and all later works in the conflict between the two are very harsh and insulting in their language and often filled with personal insults. According to Conrad Ibn Buṭlān would later portray Ibn Riḍwān's attitude in this response as that of the stingy dinner party host who rages at guests eating scraps during his sleep.

Ibn Buṭlān responded reciprocally with another essay to Ibn Riḍwān's response which he called the Egyptian Essay. In the first chapter of this treatise he advances seven reasons as to why in-person learning from a mentor is preferable to learning from books alone. Among these are that teacher is able to correct inaccurate interpolation from manuscripts, explain difficult sections, and correct mistakes made by the student. He explain this with instructor and student being homogenous in their natures making transmission of knowledge easy. Contrarily he argues that as book and student are heterogenous in nature and hence transmission between the two is difficult. In the second chapter he argues that learning exclusively from books introduces a circulus vitiosus, as incorrect information becomes the lens through which all new acquired knowledge is filtered, which then creates a feedback loop, tainting all further learning from books. Though many of Ibn Buṭlān's arguments are observed to be reasonable ones on their face and eloquently stated by commentators, they all primarily serve to discredit Ibn Riḍwān: by attacking his humble background and a previously advanced position of his that learning from books is superior to learning from teachers.

This was a slight which Ibn Riḍwān observed and polemicised against in his response Discourse of the Sheikh Abū 'l-Ḥasan ʿAlī Ibn Riḍwān on the Fact that his Own Knowledge is True and is Wisdom and that the Opinions of Muḫtār Ibn al-Ḥasan Ibn of Baghdad are Faulty and are Sophistry. Ibn Riḍwān would conclude their feud with another work, the Missive of the Sheikh Abū 'l-Ḥasan ʿAlī Ibn Riḍwān Addressed to the Physicians of Old Cairo (Miṣr) and the (New) Cairo of al-Muʿizz may Allāh the Most High Protect it — in which he complains about his condition and what has happened between himself and the learned al-Muḫtār ibn al-Ḥasan of Baghdad, the physician. Addressed to the medical community of Egypt this relatively short work gives a brief portrayal of the conflict as concerned with matters of learning about Hippocrates and Galen, claiming that Ibn Riḍwān himself is correct about all points and Ibn Buṭlān is a fraud whose statements are to be taken as jokes and advising against any cooperation with him. This last missive appears to have been successful in ruining any prospects of Ibn Buṭlān in Egypt, as he left the country after having remained there for a year. Some scholars claim that Ibn Buṭlān would give his view of events though long after having left Egypt in a satirical work they identify as quasi-autobiographical, The Physicians' Banquet.

Reception and interpretation 
Ibn Abī Uṣaibiʿa in his biographies of Ibn Buṭlān and Ibn Riḍwān seems to regard this conflict mostly as a matter of personal animus between the two but comments in Ibn Buṭlān's biography that the many anecdotes of the two insulting each other are entertaining but not without useful lessons, he judges Ibn Buṭlān to be more eloquent and Ibn Riḍwān to be the better physician and better educated. Schacht and Meyerhof see the origins of the conflict as personal in nature but its dimensions as helpful in illustrating the reception of Greek and Syriac texts in the Arab world. In this they largely follow Ibn Riḍwān's last portrayal of the debate as a matter concerned with the philosophy of medicine and the reception of the ancients. They conclude Ibn Buṭlān to be better educated in a broader variety of fields and to contribute more original ideas in his thinking, incorporating newer approaches like those of ar-Razī. While Ibn Riḍwān wrote more, they judge his output to be unoriginal and intellectually stagnant. Conrad disagrees with Schacht and Meyerhof's perspective and views it as a struggle for affirmation in the medical community of Egypt largely fuelled by personal dislike between two men with large egos but insightful in illustrating the complex social arrangements needed to be a successful physician in a society without institutionalised systems verifying medical learning.

Schoeler places importance on the arguments advanced by Ibn Buṭlān against book learning in the Egyptian Essay, identifying four novel arguments advanced by him. These he sees as based in the language and concepts of Ancient Greek philosophy. Additionally he identifies two as taken directly from the Islamic study of aḥādīth, thereby proving the genetic influence on the development of the medical sciences and philosophy practiced by non-Muslims in the Islamicate world.

Travels and death in Byzantine territory 
His name being ruined in Egypt due to the Battle of the Physicians Ibn Buṭlān travelled to Syria via Jaffa in 442 AH/1050 AD. There he remarked the high child mortality of the city and the lack of a teacher for the city's boys. From there he went on to Antioch, Abū Dharr al-Harauī suggests he spent time in both Antioch and Aleppo during this period. In his Essay on Hot and Cold Remedies from 455 AH/1063 AD Ibn Buṭlān however cites "master teachers of the city" on living conditions and other rudimentary information like the weather and housing conditions, this according to Conrad might suggest that Ibn Buṭlān did not return to the city due to his ruined reputation from his previous squabble there, rather relying on colleagues for information. Ibn Buṭlān personally reports on the Church of al-Qusyān and its administration. The church had been struck by lightning during a storm in April 1050 AD and required repairs. On the 5th of August that year he reports about a number of earth quakes which had occurred in Byzantine territory, destroying a fortress and a church, numerous farms, and bringing forth hot springs and a swamp, causing the inhabitants of the affected places to lose all their belongings and flee to cities like Antioch. From Antioch headed to Ṭarsūs, where he reported on the tomb of al-Maʾmūn which had fallen into disrepair.

From there he travelled to Constantinople to join a monastery there, during this journey he wrote the Essay on the Holy Eucharist at the behalf of the Patriarch of Constantinople, Michael I Cerularius. The fact that he was invited by such an important figure of Eastern Christianity to elucidate the Oriental perspective on the debates leading to the Schism of 1054, demonstrates that his outstanding reputation was not limited to Islamic circles in the Fatimid and Abbasid caliphates but extended also into the Christian world. This is becomes furthermore evident when looking at Ibn Buṭlān's interaction with the wazir   on a diplomatic mission to the Byzantine capital on behalf of the ʿUqailid Emir . Faḫr ad-Daula remarked how warmly received and cared for he was by Ibn Buṭlān and also how much access his host had to the Byzantine Emperor Constantine IX Monomachos. This must have occurred prior to 443 AH/1052 AD given the Emir's short reign. In the year 446 AH/1054 AD Ibn Buṭlān observed a plague in Constantinople in which 14,000 bodies were buried in the cemetery of the church St. Luke, after all other burial grounds were filled. According to Ibn Abī Uṣaibiʿa he authored The Physicians' Banquet in the monastery in Constantiople, but Kennedy speculates that most of the work was written prior to his departure from Egypt. He dedicated the work to the Marwanid Emir Naṣr ad-Daula Abū Naṣr Aḥmād ibn Marwān the ruler of Māiyafāriqīn in the province of Diyār Bakr. He visited the city and met Abū Yaḥyā the son of Abū 'l-Qasim al-Ḥusain ibn ʿAlī al-Maġribī, though he likely visited after having finished the work. When exactly he visited the city is unclear, though Conrad suggests that it might have initially been on his journey to Constantinople, returning for a second time later to present The Physicians' Banquet. In the treatise itself he comments on the low level of medical knowledge in the town, though as some scholars regard the work as allegorical for his experiences in Cairo this might not be considered a neutral report.

Having seemingly hastily finished the Essay on the Holy Eucharist and not being able to speak Greek Ibn Buṭlān relied on an interpreter, named ʿĪsa, provided by the Patriarch to have his arguments communicated in Greek at the synod of Byzantine prelates, first in private to Cerularius, then publicly to all present, with a later reading to the papal delegates at the synod being planned but never occurring due to the papal delegates never showing up with the synod eventually being dissolved. Ibn Buṭlān's involvement with the Patriarch of Constantinople and his stay in a monastery in Constantinople raise the question of his religious affiliation: his background and education in Baghdad, the episode involving Aleppo's Christian community, and the Essay on the Holy Eucharist themselves provide strong evidence that Ibn Buṭlān at least up to this point was a Nestorian Christian of the Eastern Syriac Rite, as Conrad however points out, there are indicators, that he "was fairly undifferentiated" in his understanding of his Christian identity with cautious distance to all different denominations. Further supporting Oltean's hypothesis about Seth's friendship and intellectual camaraderie is Pietrobelli and Cronier's hypothesis of a relationship between Ibn Buṭlān and Symeon Seth based not simply on time and place alone but also based on their intellectual output. Namely, Seth's uncredited reception of Buṭlān's Taqwīm aṣ-Ṣiḥḥa in form of a partial translation in his work On the Handbook of Health by the Balance of the Six Causes. Hence they argue the historical and textual evidence makes the polymath Seth a likely student of the physician Ibn Buṭlān during the 1060s and possibly before. Mavroudi also hypothesizes a possible relationship between Michael Psellos and Ibn Buṭlān, whom she firmly situates within the Nestorian tradition likening the use of men who from the Eastern Orthodox perspective are heretics to Psellos use of pagan authors in this same debate.

Oltean unlike other scholars does not highlight isolated relationships of Ibn Buṭlān's but rather identifies an entire intellectual circle to in Byzantine territory to which Ibn Buṭlān belonged. He sees that Ibn Buṭlān's approach in his essay, which seems to focus on reconciliation between the two conflicting sides, echoes the position of the Greek Orthodox Patriarch Peter III of Antioch. Which ties him, as the key figure, into this intellectual circle as well. Graf also argues that Ibn Buṭlān's treatise is not original, but rather an echo of Greek polemics particularly those of Peter III of Antioch and of Cerularius himself. His reason for this is the argument that there was no serious discussion or standardised practice regarding which offering is to be employed during the Holy Eucharist in the Greek, Syriac, and Coptic churches prior Cerularius bringing up the issue and Ibn Buṭlān being the first Oriental Christian to dogmatically comment on the issue, there were no other sources Ibn Buṭlān could have consulted. It is only in sections on the dogmatic categorisation of Eucharist and sections mentioning certain cultic practices during the Eucharist and the reason for their existence that Ibn Buṭlān departs from echoing Greek perspectives on the issue and argues truly from a Nestorian perspective. On these issues Ibn Buṭlān isn't the first Oriental Christian exegete and the primary source for his arguments is his teacher Ibn aṭ-Ṭaiyib, though Ibn Buṭlān seems to argue more rigidly and certain of his beliefs than his teacher.      
After his time in Constantinople he returned to Antioch. Where he would spend his last years in a monastery, writing and constructing the hospital. In this context he would pen the Compendium for the Monasteries and the Monks, which in its last two chapters display great knowledge of and concern for the monastical life and the common needs arising therein. His good connections in Antioch and possible friendship with the Peter III certainly would explain the choice of location. Oltean argues based on the lack of a Nestorian community in Antioch and the troubled state of the Jacobite Armenian Monophysite community in the city and his mockery of their creed in the Banquet of the Priests, that he must have joined a Melkite monastery there. Based on Oltean's research the most likely choice for this monastery appears to be the Monastery of Symeon the Younger, which Ibn Buṭlān had praised earlier during his travels. In this context he likely even met Nikon of the Black Mountain and played a role in his possible emission to Baghdad. Though the lack of more concrete sources for this later part of his life make many of these conclusions speculative.

Astronomical observations 

A large supernova named SN 1054 in modern astronomy occurred in the year 1054 AD/446 AH. It was well observed by Chinese and Japanese astronomers in their writings, the great detail of which allowed for it to be identified as the origin of the Crab Nebula in the modern day. But modern astronomers were puzzled by the lack of European and Middle Eastern reports of the event. This lack of recordings was used by George Sarton to suggest that "the failure of medieval Europeans and Arabs to recognise such phenomena was not due to any difficulty in seeing them, but to prejudice and spiritual inertia connected with the groundless belief in celestial perfection". Other researchers hypothesised the skies in the Middle East and Europe had been entirely clouded for six months during the occurrence of the supernova.

The discovery and interpretation of Ibn Abī Uṣaibiʿa's writings on Ibn Buṭlān by the astrophysicist Kenneth Brecher in 1978 led to a reconsideration of such positions and consequently to the discovery of medieval Arab medical sources as useful to modern astronomers, as these records did suggest Ibn Buṭlān had, in fact, recorded SN 1054. He believed the event to be connected to a low water level of the Nile and a consequent famine decimating much of Egypt, as well as multiple devastating epidemics throughout Egypt, Syria, Upper Mesopotamia, the Iraq, Persia, and the Yemen.

Ibn Buṭlān was not a professional astronomer nor an astrologer, rather he was a physician operating according to the tradition of Galen and Hippocrates both of whom believed in a connection between cosmic and telluric events, illness and natural catastrophes. The separation between astrologers and physicians however remains clear in these Greek texts, but this separation of functions went away in the reception of the Greeks by medieval Arabs and Persians. Hence Ibn Buṭlān observed the stars with the intent of gaining knowledge of medical importance like many of his contemporary physicians. While he engages in astronomy, he does not express any confidence in this science, in fact in matters were astrological and physiological or pathological insight collide, the latter two always prevail in his analyses, something which also representative of the attitudes of most of his contemporaries. Ibn Abī Uṣaibiʿa by quoting Ibn Buṭlān in the encyclopaedic entry about him (as well as in the entry about Ibn Riḍwān) preserved enough information to identify the supernova. As the former quotation introduces problems in determining the dates of the event with when Ibn Buṭlān supposedly observed it, while the latter reveals these problems to be due to an error made by Ibn Abī Uṣaibiʿa in quoting from Ibn Buṭlān the former passage:

Though he connects his observations to predictions by Ptolemy about a comet, what is termed in this report a 'star leaving marks' is, in fact, a supernova and the terminology used resembles that used by Ibn Riḍwān  when he described the supernova SN 1006. This supernova was witnessed by Ibn Riḍwān in April and May 1006 AD/Raǧab of 396 AH, termed by him to have been during "at the beginning of my studies". Of the two dates given for the supernova's appearance in this quoted account: 445 and 446 AH, one must be false. Thus the before-mentioned second encyclopaedic entry about Ibn Riḍwān by Ibn Abī Uṣaibiʿa is helpful in making apparent Ibn Abī Uṣaibiʿa's erroneous date in the second paragraph of the first quotation, as in this second quotation Ibn Buṭlān is quoted about a shortage of supplies in Egypt in 445 AH which he says was increased when the Nile fell 'in the year which followed it.' Ibn Buṭlān's comments about the level of Nile failing to rise refer to the period prior to its annual flooding during midsummer and hence also speak of the season during which we know the supernova occurred.

Jadon identifies this event as pivotal in Ibn Buṭlān's eyes for the history of medicine in the Near East. According to him a decline both in scholarly writing on medicine and the quality of medical practice was underway at this time and he credited it to this plague and its decimating effects on the number of scholars and physicians.

Reception 
In the 12th century a physician from Baghdad, ʿAli ibn Aṯradī wrote a commentary for The Physicians' Banquet. He was a member of a Nestorian Baghdadian family which provided 3 generations worth of prominent physician-philosophers. At the request of Maḥfūẓ ibn al-Masīḥī a Christian physician from the city of an-Nīl in the Iraq he wrote and sent the work as a missive. His commentary is solely concerned with addressing the questions which are posed by the young physician but not answeed in the original work. The satirical character thereof goes unnoticed by him, as he answers questions which were posed in a humorous fashion by Ibn Buṭlān with lengthy deliberations of his own. In this treatise it becomes clear that ʿAli ibn Aṯradī unlike Ibn Buṭlān was not an empiricist this makes his explanations of his diagnostic process valuable, in addition to this feature he also incorporates of Ibn Sīna whom ʿAli ibn Aṯradī credits for the idea of such a work addressing questions by a prominent physician. This also speaks to Ibn Buṭlān's reputation during that period. Klein-Franke, Dagher, and Troupeau claim Ibn Buṭlān himself did not incorporate any thought from Ibn Sīna into his work, as he likely did not have any knowledge of him and view this commentary as the first point of contact between their respective works. Jadon however identifies the Compendium for the Monasteries and the Monks, partially at least as an abbridgment of the Qānūn by Ibn Sīna.

Ibn Buṭlān is variously known by the by the names Elbochasim de baldach, Elbocasim de baldach, Albulkasem de Baldac, Ububchasym de Baldach, Eluchasem Elimitar, and Albullasem de baldak in medieval Latin texts and Europe at large. Baldach being Medieval Latin for Baghdad.

There is some ambiguity in determining the birthday and date of death for Ibn Buṭlān. With regards to the birthday this is not surprising as such information was not of any social importance in the 11th century Arab world and the actual age of a person of secondary importance compared to the idealised age of 72 years in medieval Arab biographical literature. Conrad suggests that Ibn Buṭlān likely did not even himself know when he was born. With regards to his date of passing most of the confusion comes down to an error introduced by al-Qifṭī; who in his biography of Ibn Buṭlān claims he died in the year 444 AH/1052 AD. This is an impossibility given that Ibn Abī Uṣaibiʿa lists works written up to 11 years after that time and even quotes Ibn Buṭlān commenting on previously discussed astronomical events which modern science can securely say occurred after that that date. This date was also used by Schacht for his entry on Ibn Buṭlān in the Encyclopaedia of Islam. As well as by Klein-Franke in his biography of Ibn Buṭlān. Though other scholars like Graf (who also identifies the date of 444 AH as incorrect) state more general date ranges like "after 1067/68"; Ibn Buṭlān commonly uses , that is Anno Graecorum for dates in his texts, this often causes trouble for other authors when converting it to other systems, Ibn Abī Uṣaibiʿa converts the Year of Alexander 1365 to 450 AH, miscalculating by 4 years, while an apostille in a manuscript of the Essay on the Holy Eucharist converts Ibn Buṭlān giving the Year of Alexander 1365 to 760 Era of the Martyrs instead of 770 Era of the Martyrs.

At times a work called  is falsely attributed to Ibn Buṭlān, it is however a work by an Andalusian botanist.

Writings

Further reading 
Works by Ibn Buṭlān published in Arabic:
 Hosam Elkhadem: Le "Taqwim al-sihha" (Tacuini sanitatis) d’ Ibn Butlan: Un traité médical du XIe siècle. Histoire du texte, édition critique, traduction, commentaire (Académie royale de Belgique, Classe des lettres, Fonds René Draguet, vol. 7), Leuven, Belgium, Aedibus Peeters, 1990. ISBN 90-6831-271-5 (Entire Taqwīm aṣ-Ṣiḥḥa edited together from 15 Arabic manuscripts with a critical apparatus)
Joseph Schacht, Max Meyerhof: Medico–Philosophical Controversy Between Ibn Butlan of Baghdad and Ibn Ridwan of Cairo, Cairo, Egypt, The Egyptian University, The Faculty of Arts Publication No. 13, 1937. (Contains both Arabic text and English translation) Archive.org
Felix Klein-Franke: The Physicians' Dinner Party,  Wiesbaden, Germany, Otto Harrassowitz, 1985. (critical edition composed from manuscripts and two older editions of the text) 
 Dr. Bišāra bin Ǧabrāʾīl Zalzal: Kitāb Daʿwat al-Aṭibbāʾ, Khedival Press Alexandria, Alexandria Egypt, 1901. Archive.org
Philip F. Kennedy, Jeremy Farrell: The Doctors' Dinner Party, New York, USA, New York University Press, 2023 
Father Iġnāṭiyūs ʿAbduh Ḫalīfa: Kitāb Daʿwat al-Qusūs in al-Mašriq vol. 80, pp. 7–36 Beirut, Lebanon, 1959. archive.alsharekh.org Archive.org
Taḥqīq Hārūn ʿAbdu 's-Salām: Risāla fī širāʾ ar-Raqīq wa-taqlīb al-ʿAbīd; yalīhā Hidāya al-Murīd fī širāʾ al-ʿAbīd  in Nawādir al-Maḫṭūṭāt vol. 1, pp. 351–389, Cairo, Egypt, Maṭbaʿa Laǧna at-Taʾlīf wa-'t-Tarǧama wa-'n-Našr, 1954. Archive.org 
Republished by Muḥammad al-Ġazālī as: Risāla fī širāʾ ar-Raqīq wa-taqlīb al-ʿAbīd; yalīhā Hidāya al-Murīd fī širāʾ al-ʿAbīd in Beirut, Lebanon, 2019. 
Samira Yousef Jadon: The Arab Physician Ibn Buṭlān (d. 1066) Medical Manual for the Use of Monks and Country People. PhD thesis. University of California. Los Angeles. 1968
Translations of works by Ibn Buṭlān:

Felix Klein-Franke: Das Ärztebankett, Stuttgart, Germany: Hippokrates Verlag 1984 . (Contains a translation of the treatise by ʿAli ibn Aṯradī as well) (German)
Joseph Dagher, Gérard Troupeau: Le banquet des prêtres - Une maqâma chrétienne du XIe siècle, Librairie orientaliste Paul Geuthner, Paris, France, 2004. (French)
Joseph Dagher, Gérard Troupeau: Le banquet des médecins : une maqama médicale du XIe siècle, Librairie orientaliste Paul Geuthner, Paris, France, 2008.  (French)
Hans Müller: Ibn Buṭlān in Die Kunst des Sklavenkaufs: nach arabischen, persischen und türkischen Ratgebern vom 10. bis zum 18. Jahrhundert (Islamkundliche Untersuchungen Band 57)  pp. 45–80, Freiburg, Klaus Schwarz Verlag, 1980. , MENAdoc - MLU Halle/Saale (contains a full translation of the Tractate on Buying Slaves and background information of the Berlin manuscript used by Taḥqīq Hārūn ʿAbdu s-Salām) (German)
Antonella Ghersetti: Trattato generale sull'acquisto e l'esame degli schiavi, Abramo, Catanzaro, Italy, 2001. (contains a full translation of the Tractate on Buying Slaves) , Academia.edu (Italian)
Floréal Sanagustin: Médecine et société en Islam médiéval. Ibn Buṭlān ou la connaissance médicale au service de la communauté. Le cas de l'esclavage, Geuthner, Paris, France, 2010.  (contains a full translation of the Tractate on Buying Slaves) (French)
Simon Swain: Appendix: Ibn Buṭlān, General Treatise on the Skills Useful for Purchasing and Examining Slaves in Economy, Family, and Society from Rome to Islam: A Critical Edition, English Translation, and Study of Bryson's Management of the Estate, pp. 270–279, Cambridge University Press, The Edinburgh Building, Cambridge, England, 2013.  (translation of the first two chapters) (English)
 Tacuini sanitatis Elluchasem Elimithar medici de Baldath de sex rebus non naturalibus, earum naturis, operationibus et rectificationibus […] recens exarati. Hans Schott, Straßburg 1531. Digitalised Ub Düsseldorf Digitalised MDZ; (Latin)
 Michael Herr: Schachtafelen der Gesuntheyt. Hans Schott, Straßburg 1533; Reprint Darmstadt around 1970; New Print Weinheim a. d. Bergstraße/ Leipzig 1988 (with a post scriptum by Marlit Leber and Elfriede Starke). (translation of the Latin text; German)
 Luisa Cogliati Arano, Adele Westbrook (English translator), Oscar Ratti (English translator): The Medieval Health Handbook - Tacuinu Sanitatis, George Braziller Inc, New York, USA, 1976.  (English)
Ġolāmḥossein Yūsefī (publisher); Unknown 12th century translator: Tarǧomeh-ye-Taqwīm-e-al-Ṣiḥḥa, Entešārāt-e-Bonyād-e-Farhang-e-Īrān, Tehran, Iran, 1971. (Persian) Archive.org
Literature about Ibn Buṭlān:

 Joseph Schacht: Ibn Buṭlān in Encyclopaedia of Islam, Second Edition, vol. 3, pp. 740–742, edited by B. Lewis, V.L. Ménage, Ch. Pellat and J. Schacht, Assisted by C. Dumont, E. van Donzel and G.R. Hawting eds., 1971.  ISBN 90-04-08118-6
 Roger Arnaldez: Ibn Buṭlān, Abu 'l-Ḥasan Al-Mukhtār Ibn ʿAbdūn Ibn SaʿDūn in Encyclopaedia of the History of Science, Technology and Medicine in Non-Western Cultures, ed. Helaine Selin,  pg. 417–418, Kluwer Academic Publishers, Dordrecht, Netherlands 1997 Encyclopedia.com Springer.com
 Fuat Sezgin: 'Alî ibn Ridwân (d. c. 1061) and Al-Mukhtâr ibn Butlân (d. 1066). Texts and Studies. Collected and Reprinted in Publications of the Institute for the History of Arabic-Islamic Science 47, Institute for the History of Arabic-Islamic Science, Goethe University, Frankfurt am Main, Germany, 1996. 
 Daniel Oltean: From Baghdad to Antioch and Constantinople: Ibn Buṭlān and the Byzantines in Byzantinische Zeitschrift, Vol. 114.1, pp. 355–376, Munich, Germany, Walter de Gruyter, April 22, 2021
 Joseph Schacht, Max Meyerhof: Une controverse médico-philosophique au Caire en 441 de l'Hégire (1050 ap. J.-C.), avec un aperçu sur les études grecques dans l'Islam, in Bulletin de l'Institut d'Égypte (Le Caire) 19, pp. 29–43, Institut d'Égypte, Cairo, Egypt, 1937 (French) Archive.org
Mōḥammed Āṣef Fekrat: Ibn Buṭlān. In Dāʾirat al-Maʿārif-i Buzurg-i Islāmī, vol. 3, pg. 443–445, Tehran Iran, Center for the Great Islamic Encyclopedia, 1956  
Antoine Pietrobelli, Marie Cronier: Arabic Galenism from Antioch to Byzantium: Ibn Buṭlān and Symeon Seth in Mediterranea. International Journal on the Transfer of Knowledge; Vol. 7 pp. 281–315, Córdoba, Spain, Editorial Universidad de Córdoba, 2022. UCOPress
Šākir Luʿaybī: Riḥla ibn Buṭlān, Dār as-Suwaidī li-'l-Nashr wa-'t-Tawzīʿ, Abu Dhabi, UAE, 2006 (Arabic)
ʿAli ibn Aṯradī (died ca. 1160 AD); Joseph Dagher, Gérard Troupeau, André Miquel: Réponses aux questions posées par Ibn Butlan dans le Banquet des médecins, Librairie orientaliste Paul Geuthner, Paris, France,  2011.  (French)
Friedrun R. Hau: Ibn Buṭlān in Enzyklopädie Medizingeschichte, pg. 223, Walter de Gruyter, Berlin, 2004  (German)
Eva Baer: The Illustrations for an Early Manuscript of Ibn Butlan's "Daʿwat al-Aṭibbāʾ" in the L. A. Mayer Memorial in Jerusalem. In Muqarnas, Vol. 19 (2002), pp. 1–11 
 Lawrence I. Conrad: Ibn Buṭlān in Bilād al-Shām. The Career of a Travelling Christian Physician. In: David Thomas (ed.): Syrian Christians under Islam. The first thousand Years, Leiden/Boston/Köln. 2001, pp. 131–158. 
 Lawrence I. Conrad: Scholarship and social context: a medical case from the eleventh-century Near East, In: Donald G. Bates (ed.), Knowledge and the Scholarly Medical Traditions, Cambridge, Cambridge University Press, 1995, pp. 84–100. 
Danielle Jacquart: The influence of Arabic medicine in the medieval West. In: Roshdi Rashed (publisher): Encyclopedia of the History of Arabic Science, London, Routledge, 1996, vol. 3, pp. 963–984.

Footnotes

References

1052 deaths
1064 deaths
1066 deaths
11th-century Arabs
Arab Christians
Physicians from the Abbasid Caliphate
11th-century physicians
People from Baghdad
Year of birth unknown
11th-century people from the Abbasid Caliphate
Nestorians in the Abbasid Caliphate
Members of the Assyrian Church of the East